Isabelle Thomas may refer to:

 Isabelle Thomas (geographer), professor at Université Catholique de Louvain
 Isabelle Thomas (politician), former Member of the European Parliament